{{Speciesbox
| name = African emerald cuckoo
| image = Emerald cuckoo (Chrysococcyx cupreus insularum) male Sao Tome.jpg
| image_caption = Male C. c. intermediusSão Tomé and Príncipe
| image2 = Chrysococcyx cupreus, wyfie, Eshowe, Birding Weto, a.jpg
| image2_caption = Female *C. c. Eshowe, KwaZulu-Natal
| status = LC
| status_system = IUCN3.1
| status_ref = 
| genus = Chrysococcyx
| species = cupreus
| authority = (Shaw, 1792)
| synonyms = 
}}

The African emerald cuckoo (Chrysococcyx cupreus) is a species of cuckoo that is native to Africa.

Taxonomy and phylogeny
As a member of the family Cuculidae, the African emerald cuckoo is an Old World cuckoo. There are four subspecies, namely C. c. cupreus, C. c. sharpei, C. c. intermedius, and C. c. insularum.C. c. cupreus: Africa south of the SaharaC. c. intermedius: Bioko (Gulf of Guinea)C. c. insularum: São Tomé, Príncipe, and Annobón (Gulf of Guinea)

Distribution
Its range covers most of sub-Saharan Africa, including Angola, Botswana, Burundi, Cameroon, Central African Republic, Republic of the Congo, DRC, Ivory Coast, Equatorial Guinea, Eritrea, Eswatini, Ethiopia, Gabon, Gambia, Ghana, Guinea, Guinea-Bissau, Kenya, Liberia, Malawi, Mali, Mozambique, Namibia, Nigeria, Rwanda, São Tomé and Príncipe, Senegal, Sierra Leone, South Africa, South Sudan, Tanzania, Togo, Uganda, Zambia, and Zimbabwe.

Description
The African emerald cuckoo is sexually dimorphic. The males have a green back and head with a yellow breast. Females are barred green and brown on their backs and green and white on their breasts. The African emerald cuckoo can also be identified by its call, a four-note whistle with the mnemonic device of “Hello Ju-dy.” 

Diet
The cuckoo's diet consists mainly of insects like caterpillars and ants. The diet can be supplemented with some fruit, and the African emerald cuckoo often forages in the middle and top layers of the canopy.

Breeding

Like most cuckoos, the African emerald cuckoo is a brood parasite. Female African emerald cuckoos lay eggs in the nests of other bird species. A female cuckoo can lay between 19 and 25 eggs on average per breeding season.
The breeding season occurs during the rainy seasons, generally during the months between September and March. Even though the cuckoos do not need territory to feed fledglings, male African emerald cuckoos still maintain territories to display themselves to potential mates.

Conservation status and threats
However, there is some concern about habitat reduction and fragmentation of riparian areas and lowland forests in the upcoming years.

Folklore
In Zulu it is known as ubantwanyana, or "little children", which suggests the song Bantwanyana! ning'endi!, or "Little children, don't get married!". In Xhosa it is mostly known as intananja, but its call is also rendered as ziph' iintombi?, meaning "where are the girls?" In Afrikaans, it is known as the mooimeisie'', or "pretty girl".

References

External links

 African emerald cuckoo - Species text in The Atlas of Southern African Birds.

Chrysococcyx
Birds of Sub-Saharan Africa
Birds described in 1792
Taxa named by George Shaw